Elco may refer to:


Places
 Elco, Illinois
 Elco, Pennsylvania

Schools
 El Camino College
 Eastern Lebanon County High School, a school in Myerstown, Pennsylvania
 El Camino High School (South San Francisco)

Businesses
 Elco Holdings, an Israeli industrial group
 Electric Launch Company, manufacturer of electric boats and yachts, and (during WWII) PT boats and air rescue craft, today Elco Motor Yachts
 Elco, a type of PT boat designed by the Electric Launch Company and built during World War II
 Electric Boat Company (today General Dynamics Electric Boat), primary submarine contractor of the U.S. Navy and former parent of Elco
 Elco, a historic Swiss watchmaker associated with the Era Watch Company

Other
 Electrolytic capacitor
 Festival de Cine Entre Largos y Cortos de Oriente, a Venezuelan film festival